Shad Darsigny (born 20 April 2003) is a Canadian weightlifter. He participated at the 2022 Commonwealth Games in the weightlifting competition where he won a bronze medal in the men's 73 kg event.

Darsigny previously participated at the 2021 and 2022 Junior World Weightlifting Championships. His coach was his father Yvan Darsigny. He and his sister Tali were awarded the bronze medals in the weightlifting competitions.

References 

Living people
Place of birth missing (living people)
2003 births
Canadian male weightlifters
Weightlifters at the 2022 Commonwealth Games
Commonwealth Games bronze medallists for Canada
21st-century Canadian people
Commonwealth Games medallists in weightlifting
Medallists at the 2022 Commonwealth Games